is the third album released by the Japanese band The Blue Hearts.

It was named one of the top albums from 1989-1998 in a 2004 issue of the music magazine Band Yarouze.

Track listing
"Train-Train" (TRAIN-TRAIN)
"Merry Go Round" (メリーゴーランド)
"Denkō Sekka" (電光石火 Lightning Speed)
"Missile" (ミサイル)
"Boku no Migite" (僕の右手 My Right Hand)
"Mugon Denwa no Burūzu" (無言電話のブルース Silent Telephone Blues)
"Fūsen Bakudan" (風船爆弾 Fire Balloon)
"Love Letter" (ラブレター)
"Nagaremono" (ながれもの Wanderer)
"Burūzu o Ketobase" (ブルースをけとばせ Kick the Blues)
"Aozora" (青空 Blue Sky)
"Omae o Hanasanai" (お前を離さない I Won't Leave You)

References

The Blue Hearts albums
1988 albums